American Express Company (Amex) is an American multinational financial services corporation specialized in payment cards headquartered in New York City. It is one of the most valuable companies in the world and one of the 30 components of the Dow Jones Industrial Average. The company's logo, adopted in 1958, is a gladiator or centurion whose image appears on the company's well-known traveler's cheques, charge cards, and credit cards. It is based in the American Express Tower in the Battery Park City neighborhood of Lower Manhattan where it maintains its corporate offices. They are the largest provider of traveler's cheques worldwide.

Founded in 1850 as an express mail dispatcher, the company introduced financial and travel services to clientele during the early 1900s. American Express developed their first paper charge card in 1958, gold card in 1966, green card in 1969, platinum card in 1984, and centurion card in 1999. The "Don't Leave Home Without It" ad campaign was introduced in 1975 and renewed in 2005. During the 1980s, the firm invested and divested in the brokerage industry, through a stake in Shearson Lehman Hutton. In the 1990s, they discontinued cutting interchange fees for merchants who exclusively accepted their cards and expanded their market share through targeted marketing campaigns. They converted into a bank holding company during the 2008 financial crisis. The firm launched their airport lounge amenity in 2013.

American Express accounts for 22.9% of the total dollar volume of domestic credit card transactions (as of 2016) with 56.4million cards in force in the U.S. and 121.7million cards globally (as of 2021). The average cardholder spends $23,496 annually. In 2017, Forbes named American Express the most valuable brand in global financial services, and 23rd overall, with an estimate brand value of US$24.5billion. In 2020, Fortune magazine placed the company ninth in their list of Top 100 Companies to Work For feature, based on an employee survey of satisfaction.

Early history 

In 1850, American Express was started as an express mail business in Buffalo, New York. It was founded as a joint-stock corporation by the merger of the express companies owned by Henry Wells (Wells & Company), William G. Fargo (Livingston, Fargo & Company), and John Warren Butterfield (Wells, Butterfield & Company, the successor earlier in 1850 of Butterfield, Wasson & Company). Wells and Fargo also started Wells Fargo & Co. in 1852 when Butterfield and other directors objected to the proposal that American Express extend its operations to California. American Express initially established its headquarters in a building at the intersection of Jay Street and Hudson Street in what was later called the Tribeca section of Manhattan. For years it enjoyed a virtual monopoly on the movement of express shipments (goods, securities, currency, etc.) throughout New York State. In 1874, American Express moved its headquarters to 65 Broadway in what was becoming the Financial District of Manhattan, a location it was to retain through two buildings.In 1854, the American Express Co. purchased a lot on Vesey Street in New York City as the site for its stables. The company's first New York headquarters was an 1858 marble Italianate palazzo at 55–61 Hudson Street, which had a busy freight depot on the ground story with a spur line from the Hudson River Railroad. A stable was constructed in 1867, five blocks north at 4–8 Hubert Street. The company prospered sufficiently that headquarters were moved in 1874 from the wholesale shipping district to the budding Financial District and into rented offices in two five-story brownstone commercial buildings at 63 and 65 Broadway that were owned by the Harmony family.

In 1880, American Express built a new warehouse behind the Broadway Building at 46 Trinity Place. The designer is unknown, but it has a façade of brick arches that are reminiscent of pre-skyscraper New York. American Express has long been out of this building, but it still bears a terracotta seal with the American Express Eagle. In 1890–91 the company constructed a new ten-story building by Edward H. Kendall on the site of its former headquarters on Hudson Street. By 1903, the company had assets of some $28 million, second only to the National City Bank of New York among financial institutions in the city. To reflect this, the company purchased the Broadway buildings and site. At the end of the Wells-Fargo reign in 1914, an aggressive new president, George Chadbourne Taylor (1868–1923), who had worked his way up through the company over the previous thirty years, decided to build a new headquarters. The old buildings, dubbed by The New York Times as "among the ancient landmarks" of lower Broadway, were inadequate for such a rapidly expanding concern.

After some delays due to the First World War, the 21-story neo-classical American Express Co. Building was constructed in 1916–17 to the design of James L. Aspinwall, of the firm of Renwick, Aspinwall & Tucker, the successor to the architectural practice of the eminent James Renwick Jr. The building consolidated the two lots of the former buildings with a single address: 65 Broadway. This building was part of the "Express Row" section of lower Broadway at the time. The building completed the continuous masonry wall of its block-front and assisted in transforming Broadway into the "canyon" of neo-classical masonry office towers familiar to this day. American Express sold this building in 1975, but retained travel services there. The building was also the headquarters over the years of other prominent firms, including investment bankers J.& W. Seligman & Co. (1940–74), the American Bureau of Shipping, a maritime concern (1977–86), and later J.J. Kenny, and Standard & Poor's, the latter of which renamed the building for itself.

National expansion
American Express extended its reach nationwide by arranging affiliations with other express companies (including Wells Fargo – the replacement for the two former companies that merged to form American Express), railroads, and steamship companies. In 1857, American Express started its expansion in the area of financial services by launching a money order business to compete with the United States Post Office's money orders. Sometime between 1888 and 1890, J. C. Fargo took a trip to Europe and returned frustrated and infuriated. Despite the fact that he was president of American Express and that he carried with him traditional letters of credit, he found it difficult to obtain cash anywhere except in major cities. Fargo went to Marcellus Flemming Berry and asked him to create a better solution than the letter of credit. Berry introduced the American Express Traveler's Cheque which was launched in 1891 in denominations of $10, $20, $50, and $100.

Traveler's cheques established American Express as a truly international company. In 1914, at the onset of World War I, American Express in Europe was among the few companies to honor the letters of credit (issued by various banks) held by Americans in Europe, because other financial institutions refused to assist these stranded travelers. The British government appointed American Express its official agent at the beginning of World War I. They were to deliver letters, money, and relief parcels to British prisoners of war. Their employees went into camps to cash drafts for both British and French prisoners and arranged for them to receive money from home. By the end of the war they were delivering 150 tonnes of parcels per day to prisoners in six countries.

Railroad express business

American Express was one of the monopolies that President Theodore Roosevelt had the Interstate Commerce Commission (ICC) investigate during his administration. The interest of the ICC was drawn to its strict control of the railroad express business. However, the solution did not come immediately to hand. The solution to this problem came as a coincidence to other problems during World War I. During the winter of 1917, the United States suffered a severe coal shortage and on December 26 President Woodrow Wilson commandeered the railroads on behalf of the United States government to move federal troops, their supplies, and coal. Treasury Secretary William Gibbs McAdoo was assigned the task of consolidating the railway lines for the war effort. All contracts between express companies and railroads were nullified and McAdoo proposed that all existing express companies be consolidated into a single company to serve the country's needs. This ended American Express's express business and removed them from the ICC's interest. The result was that a new company called the American Railway Express Agency formed in July 1918. In 1966, American Express introduced the Gold Card. American Express formed a venture with Warner Communications in 1979, called Warner-Amex Satellite Entertainment, which created MTV, Nickelodeon, and The Movie Channel. The partnership lasted only until 1984. The properties were sold to Viacom soon after.

1980s to present

Shearson Lehman Hutton, IDS: 1981–1994 

During the 1980s, American Express embarked on an effort to become a financial services holding company and made a number of acquisitions, creating an investment banking arm. In mid-1981 it purchased Sanford I. Weill's Shearson Loeb Rhoades, the second-largest securities firm in the United States to form Shearson/American Express. Shearson Loeb Rhoades itself was the culmination of several mergers in the 1970s as Weill's Hayden, Stone & Co. merged with Shearson, Hammill & Co. in 1974, to form Shearson Hayden Stone. Shearson Hayden Stone then merged with Loeb, Rhoades, Hornblower & Co. (formerly Loeb, Rhoades & Co.) to form Shearson Loeb Rhoades in 1979. With capital totaling $250 million at the time of its acquisition, Shearson Loeb Rhoades trailed only Merrill Lynch as the securities industry's largest brokerage firm.

After the purchase of Shearson, Weill was given the position of president of American Express in 1983. Weill grew increasingly unhappy with responsibilities within American Express and his conflicts with American Express' CEO James D. Robinson III. Weill soon realized that he was not positioned to be named CEO and left in August 1985. In 1984, American Express acquired the investment banking and trading firm Lehman Brothers Kuhn Loeb, and added it to the Shearson family, creating Shearson Lehman/American Express. It was Lehman's CEO and former trader Lewis Glucksman who would next lead Shearson Lehman/American Express. In 1984, Shearson/American Express also purchased the 90-year-old Investors Diversified Services (IDS), bringing with it a fleet of financial advisors and investment products. In 1988, Shearson Lehman acquired the brokerage firm E.F. Hutton & Co. E.F. Hutton was merged with the investment banking business and the investment banking arm was renamed Shearson Lehman Hutton, Inc.

TDB American Express Bank, Switzerland 
In 1983, Edmond Safra, the owner of Trade Development Bank in Geneva, sold his bank for US$550 million to American Express. Safra was inducted into the board of American Express. The acquisition of TDB by American Express was part of James D. Robinson III's plan to break into the private depositor banking industry. TDB American Express was intended to be the third arm of American Express's financial empire which would reach wealthy private depositors internationally. In 1984, the company launched the Platinum Card, defining different market segments within its own business, a practice that has proliferated across a broad array of industries. The Platinum Card was billed as super-exclusive and had a $250 annual fee. In 1987, American Express introduced the Optima card, its first credit card product that did not have to be paid in full at the end of the month.

TDB quickly realized after the acquisition that American Express was not able to uphold promises with which they used to court them at the time of acquisition, as TDB executives were excluded from important company decisions. Edmond Safra, an executive at TDB, tried to separate from the mother company. After failed attempts to get American Express to accept his offers to buy TDB back, Safra opened a competing bank. In response, American Express launched an international smear campaign against Safra by inaccurately reporting to news and media outlets in that Safra was being investigated by the FBI for being involved in the Iran–Contra affair, along with drug trafficking and the mafia.

All of the accusations were confirmed to be false, and led to the resignation of Harry L. Freeman, James D. Robinson III's right-hand man and public relations chief in American Express, after admitting to the entire scandal. In July 1989, American Express publicly apologized to Edmond Safra and donated US$8 million to the charity of his choice. In 1990, American Express sold its Swiss banking operations to Compagnie de Banque et d'Investissements, which led to the creation of Union Bancaire Privée (UBP). When Harvey Golub became CEO of American Express in 1993, American Express decided to get out of the investment banking business and negotiated the sale of Shearson's retail brokerage and asset management business to Primerica. The Shearson business was merged with Primerica's Smith Barney to create Smith Barney Shearson. In April 1992, American Express spun off its former subsidiary, First Data Corp., in an initial public offering. In 1994, the Optima True Grace card was introduced. The card was unique in that it offered a grace period on all purchases whether a balance was carried on the card or not (as opposed to traditional revolving credit cards which charge interest on new purchases if so much as $1 was carried over). The card was discontinued a few years later. In 1995, American Express and Hilton announced a co-brand credit card, allowing users to earn Hilton HHonors bonus points for everyday charges.

The ONE card, introduced in 2005 but since discontinued, innovated in cash back rewards (described then as "have become staples of credit card reward programs") which are "deposited in an interest bearing savings account" The rewards account was a high-yield FDIC-insured savings account. The ONE from American Express card offered a feature similar to Optima True Grace which it called "Interest Protection." In 1994, American Express spun off of the remaining investment banking and institutional businesses as Lehman Brothers Holdings Inc, ending what The New York Times called "a nettlesome foray into the brokerage business." After almost fifteen years of independence, Lehman Brothers filed for bankruptcy protection in 2008 as part of the financial crisis of 2007–08. 

In January 2021, the Wall Street Journal reported that the Department of the Treasury, the FDIC, and the Federal Reserve had launched an investigation into whether the company had misled potential corporate customers and used aggressive tactics while selling American Express cards. After the announcement, shares of the company fell in price. The period in question was between 2015 and 2016. Following the 2022 Russian invasion of Ukraine, in March 2022, American Express announced that it would suspend all operations in Russia and Belarus.

Fees

"Boston Fee Party"
From the early 1980s until the early 1990s, American Express was known for cutting its interchange fee (also known as a "discount rate") to merchants and restaurants if they accepted only American Express and no other credit or charge cards. This prompted competitors such as Visa and Mastercard to cry foul for a while as the tactics "locked" restaurants into American Express. Capitalizing on this elitist image, American Express frequently mentioned such exclusive partnerships in its advertising.

Aside from some holdouts including Neiman Marcus (which continued exclusivity until 2011), the practice largely ended in 1991. A group of restaurants in Boston stopped accepting American Express while accepting and encouraging the use of Visa and Mastercard, including some that were exclusive to American Express. The rationale was due to far lower fees as compared with American Express' fees at the time (which were about 4% for each transaction versus around 1.2% at the time for Visa and Mastercard). The revolt, known as the "Boston Fee Party" (alluding to the Boston Tea Party), spread to over 250 restaurants across the United States, including restaurants in other cities such as New York City, Chicago, and Los Angeles. Visa offered to pay the Fee Party's legal bills, and Discover Card was able to increase their acceptance among Boston restaurants by 375%. Kenneth Chenault, then head of Travel Related Services prior to becoming American Express CEO, cut fees to bring these restaurants back into the fold. American Express then shifted its focus from exclusivity to broadening acceptance, adding mainstream merchants like Walmart to the American Express network.

Conversion to bank holding company
On November 10, 2008, during the financial crisis of 2007–2008, the company won Federal Reserve System approval to convert to a bank holding company, making it eligible for government help under the Troubled Asset Relief Program. At that time, American Express had total consolidated assets of about $127billion. In June 2009, $3.39billion in TARP funds were repaid plus $74.4million in dividend payments. In July 2009, the company ended its obligations under TARP by buying back $340million in Treasury warrants.

Charging order controversy in the UK
In November 2010, the UK division of American Express was cautioned by the Office of Fair Trading for the use of controversial charging orders against those in debt. The regulator said that the company was one of four companies who were encouraging customers to turn their unsecured credit card debts into a form of secured debt.

CFPB enforcement action
In October 2012, The Consumer Financial Protection Bureau (CFPB) announced an enforcement action with orders requiring three American Express subsidiaries to refund an estimated $85million to approximately 250,000 customers for illegal card practices between 2003 and 2012. Allegations included that American Express made misleading statements regarding signup bonuses, charged unlawful late fees, discriminated against applicants due to age, and failed to report consumer complaints to regulators.

Costco exclusivity arrangement (2004–2016)
Beginning in 2004, Costco issued co-branded American Express cards which also doubled as a membership card. Costco ended this arrangement in 2016 in the United States, and in 2015 in Canada. The cards did not have annual fees and offered cash back in form of in-store rebates on certain tiers of purchases. The TrueEarnings cards issued by Costco in the United States were an extension of an exclusive credit card network deal between Costco and American Express dating from 1999. Costco was the last major U.S. merchant that accepted American Express cards exclusively. In November 2011, Neiman Marcus, which gave similar general-purpose card exclusivity to American Express since the 1980s, began accepting Visa and Mastercard. Costco's Canadian stores ended its exclusive deal with American Express in January 2015, in favor of one with Capital One and Mastercard. Capital One did not buy accounts and balances from American Express, which required Costco Canada members to apply for the new cards instead of automatically qualifying.

On February 12, 2015, it was announced that the partnership between American Express and Costco in the United States would dissolve March 31, 2016, which was later extended to June 19, 2016. By March 2, 2015, Costco announced that Citigroup would become the exclusive issuer of Costco's credit cards and that Visa Inc. would replace American Express as the exclusive credit card network accepted at Costco's stores in the United States. The Costco deal with Visa began on June 20, 2016, and in addition to the new Citi card, Costco accepted all other Visa cards. All TrueEarnings card accounts and balances held by American Express were sold to Citigroup, and new Costco Anywhere Visa cards were sent to Costco members prior to the switch date. Concurrent with the switch to Visa, Costco no longer accepts American Express in stores, at Costco.com, or through Costco Travel. The Costco partnership represented 8%, or $80billion, of American Express' billed business and about 20%, or about $14billion, of its interest-bearing credit portfolio, according to Richard Shane of JPMorgan Chase & Co. The impact of losing the Costco card accounts was significant; in the first quarter without Costco cards, company profit dropped 10% and revenue dropped 5% compared to the previous year.

Merchant fees
Many retailers do not accept American Express cards. American Express charges merchants significantly higher fees than other credit card providers. In a court case Ohio v. American Express Co., merchants filed a class action lawsuit against American Express and claimed that charging high fees is a violation of the Sherman Antitrust Act. According to the lawsuit, accepting American Express cards costs merchants the most. In January 2017, the 2nd U.S. Circuit Court of Appeals affirmed a lower court ruling that American Express could block merchants that accept its cards from steering customers to other cards, like those offered by Visa and Mastercard. In June 2018, the U.S. Supreme Court affirmed the 2nd Circuit Court's ruling.

Airport lounges 
American Express operates a network of Centurion Lounges at major airports which are available to their Platinum and Centurion card members. The first lounge opened in 2013, at McCarran Airport and the network has expanded ever since. American Express also has agreements with other airport lounges to offer access to their Platinum and Centurion card members as part of the Global Lounge Collection. These lounge networks include:
 Delta Sky Club
 Escape Lounges
 Plaza Premium Lounges
 Airspace Lounge
 Priority Pass

In 2019, American Express acquired LoungeBuddy, a provider which offers pay-per-use access to select airport lounges worldwide.

Centurion lounges 
As of October 2021, there are fifteen Centurion Lounges in operation, mostly located in the United States with the exception of lounges in Hong Kong and London.
Charlotte Douglas International Airport – Opened 2020
Dallas/Fort Worth International Airport – Opened 2013, Relocated 2018
Denver International Airport – Opened 2021
Hong Kong International Airport – Opened 2017
Houston George Bush Intercontinental Airport – Opened 2016
Harry Reid International Airport – Opened 2013
London Heathrow Airport – Opened 2021
Los Angeles International Airport – Opened 2020
Miami International Airport – Opened 2015, Renovated 2019
New York-JFK Airport – Opened 2020
New York-LaGuardia Airport – Opened 2014, Relocated 2021
Philadelphia International Airport – Opened 2017
Phoenix Sky Harbor International Airport – Opened 2020
Seattle–Tacoma International Airport – Opened 2015, Expanded 2017
San Francisco International Airport – Opened 2014

American Express plans to open an  lounge at Washington-Reagan in 2022, and a  lounge at Atlanta's Hartsfield-Jackson in 2023.

Finances
For the fiscal year 2017, American Express reported earnings of US$2.634billion, with an annual revenue of US$35.583billion, an increase of 5.2% over the previous fiscal cycle. Its shares traded at over $83 per share, and its market capitalization was valued at over US$86.5billion in October 2018. American Express ranked 86th in the 2018 Fortune 500 list of the largest United States corporations by total revenue.

Cards
American Express executives discussed the possibility of launching a travel charge card as early as 1946, but it was not until Diners Club launched a card in March 1950, that American Express began to seriously consider the possibility. At the end of 1957, American Express CEO Ralph Reed decided to get into the card business, and by the launch date of October 1, 1958, public interest had become so significant that 250,000 cards were issued prior to the official launch date. The card was launched with an annual fee of $6, $1 higher than Diners Club, to be seen as a premium product. The first cards were made of paper, with the account number and card member's name typed. In 1959, American Express began issuing embossed plastic cards, an industry first., the company had 133.3 million cards in force, including 56.4million cards in force in the United States, each with average annual spending of $23,496. These include consumer, small business and corporate cards issued by American Express themselves and cards issued by its Global Service Network partners that run on its network (such as Commonwealth Bank, Westpac, and NAB in Australia and Lloyds Bank and Barclays Bank in the UK). On March 1, 2017, Australia's fourth-largest bank ANZ announced that it was no longer issuing American Express cards, with the support phased out entirely by August 5, 2017. American Express is the fourth largest general-purpose card network on a global basis based on purchase volume, behind China UnionPay, Visa and MasterCard. It is the 4th largest card network in the world, based on the number of cards it has in circulation. American Express is one of the partner banks to both Google and Apple's mobile wallet systems (Google Pay and Apple Pay, respectively) meaning that cardholders can use their American Express-issued cards to pay at establishments where NFC payments are accepted. American Express offers various contactless credit cards.

Consumer cards
American Express is best known for its Green, Gold, and Platinum charge cards. The Gold Card was converted to a credit card for U.K. residents in 2018, but remains a charge card in the U.S. In 1958, American Express issued its first charge card, which required payment at the end of every month. In 1966, the company issued its first gold card, in an effort to cater to the upper echelon of business travel. Its platinum card debuted in 1984. In 1999, American Express introduced the Centurion Card, often referred to as the "black card," which caters to an even more affluent customer segment. The card was initially available only to select users of the Platinum card. The annual fee for the card in the United States is $5,000 (up from $1,000 at introduction) with an additional one-time initiation fee of $10,000. American Express created the card line amid rumors and urban legends in the 1980s that it produced an ultra-exclusive black card for elite users who could purchase anything with it. American Express cards publicly issued in the United States range in cost between no annual fee (for Blue and many other consumer and business cards) and a $695 annual fee (for the Platinum card). Annual fees for the Green card start at $150, while Gold card annual fees start at $250.

As of January 2023, the company produces the following core suite of cards for consumers, some of which have corresponding business variants, along with their respective fees: 

American Express has several co-branded credit cards, with most falling into one of three categories:
 Airlines: Aerolíneas Argentinas, Aeroméxico, Air Canada, Air France, Alitalia, British Airways, Cathay Pacific, Delta Air Lines, Icelandair, KLM, Qantas, Scandinavian Airlines, Singapore Airlines, SriLankan Airlines, Thai Airways, Virgin Australia, among others.
 Hotels: Best Western, Hilton Hotels, Marriott International, and The Peninsula Hotels
 Retailers: David Jones, Holt Renfrew, Harrods, Macy's, Bloomingdales, Lowe's, Mercedes-Benz, Dillard's and others.

A credit card aimed at young adults is called Blue, which has no annual fee and a loyalty program. A television media campaign for Blue adopted the 1979 UK Synthpop hit "Cars" by Gary Numan as its theme music. A cashback reward program version, "Blue Cash", quickly followed. American Express also targeted young adults with City Reward Cards that earn INSIDE Rewards points to eat, drink, and play in New York, Chicago, and LA hot spots. American Express began phasing out the INSIDE cards in mid-2008, with no new applications being taken as of July 2008.

In 2002, American Express introduced Clear, advertised as the first credit card with no fees of any kind. Other cards introduced in 2005, included "The Knot" and "The Nest" Credit Cards from American Express, co-branded cards developed with the wedding planning website theknot.com. In 2006, the UK division of American Express joined the Product Red coalition and issued a Red Card, donating with each purchase through The Global Fund to Fight AIDS, Tuberculosis and Malaria to help African women and children with HIV/AIDS, malaria, and other diseases. In 2009, American Express introduced the ZYNC charge card. White in color, this card was created for people aged 20–40. The Zync charge card has since been discontinued with the exception of current cardholders who are grandfathered into the ZYNC. In late 2012, American Express and Walmart announced the launch of Bluebird, a prepaid debit card similar to that of Green Dot. Bluebird is being touted as having some of the benefits of traditional American Express cards, such as roadside assistance and identity theft protection. The card can also be used as a substitute for a traditional checking account. Unlike other such cards, Bluebird is FDIC-insured. Bluebird accounts have standard FDIC deposit insurance and check writing capabilities, and as of March 2013 customers can have Social Security payments, military pay, Tax Return, paycheck, and other government benefits deposited directly into their accounts.

Card acceptance outside the U.S.
American Express credit cards are noted by travel guides, including Rough Guides and Lonely Planet, as being less commonly accepted in Europe than Visa or Mastercard.

Card design
The company logo, a gladiator or centurion, appears at the center of the iconic Zync, Cobalt, Blue Business, Plum, Green, Gold, Platinum, and Centurion cards. The figure and his pose evoke classical antiquity. These cards also feature intricate border and background designs that read "American Express." The designs on these cards, especially the Green card, bear resemblance to those on the United States Federal Reserve Notes.

ExpressPay

In 2005, American Express introduced ExpressPay, similar to Mastercard Contactless and Visa payWave, all of which use the symbol appearing on the right. It is a contactless payment system based on wireless RFID, where transactions are completed by holding the credit card near a receiver at which point the debt is immediately added to the account. All three contactless systems use the same logo. The card is not swiped or inserted into a smart card reader and no PIN is entered. Many merchants, in the U.S. and globally, offer American Express contactless payment, including Meijer, Walgreens, Best Buy, Chevron Corporation, Starbucks, and McDonald's.

American Express OPEN
American Express OPEN, the small-business branch of American Express, offers various types of charge cards for small businesses to manage their expenses. In late 2007, the company announced the new Plum Card as the latest addition to their card line for small business owners. The card provides a 1.5% early pay discount or up to two months to defer payment on purchases. The 1.5% discount is available for billing periods where the cardmember spends at least $5,000. The first 10,000 cards were issued to members on December 16, 2007.

In 2008, American Express closed all Business Line of Credit accounts. This decision was reached in tandem with the Federal Reserve's approval of American Express's request to become a commercial bank.

, American Express has several credit cards designed for small businesses. These include SimplyCash Plus Business Credit Card. Cashback earned is automatically credited to the cardholder's statement and other benefits are included. Other cards include the Business Platinum Card from American Express OPEN, the Business Gold Rewards Card from American Express OPEN, the Blue for Business Credit Card from American Express, Business Green Rewards Card from American Express OPEN, the Business Green Rewards Card from American Express OPEN and the Plum Card from American Express OPEN. These cards have return protection, year-end summaries and other tools to help with the business accounting and control.

Commercial cards and services
In 2008, American Express acquired the Corporate Payment Services business of GE, which primarily focused on providing Purchasing Card solutions for large global clients. As part of the $1b+ transaction, American Express also added a new product, called V-Payment, to its product portfolio. V-Payment is unique in that it enables a tightly controlled, single-use card number for increased control. , American Express offered several business, corporate and travel credit and charge cards and services and data and information services related to their use in the competitive markets for these cards. The online "American Express @ Work" function gives corporations a site on which to apply for, cancel or suspend cards, monitor policy compliance and track expenses. The cardholder company can create and generate reports for a corporate expense account program, including analytics and data consolidation or integration. Reports can be tailored for various sized companies. Through a Standard Expense Reporting feature in its "Manage Your Card Account site", American Express corporate cards provide cardholders access to pre-populated expense reports. The cardholder needs to annotate expenses and add out-of-pocket charges upon completion of which the report can be downloaded in electronic or paper format.

American Express Corporate Card program can be used with a third-party on-demand expense management tool by Concur, a provider of integrated travel and expense management services. This tool simplifies the creation of expense account reports and the corporate approval process. Corporate card activity, including viewing statements, making payments, setting up alerts and making inquiries and disputing charges, can be managed through an account online or via a mobile device through this service. The corporate cards have benefits including discounts and rebates for travel and transportation, travel and emergency help, travel insurance and baggage protection. Upgrades from the Corporate "Green" Card to the Corporate Gold Card or Corporate Platinum Card, although subject to fees and terms and conditions, have several additional benefits at each card level, such as free breakfast or late checkout at many hotels. The American Express/Business Extra Corporate Credit Card is affiliated with American Airlines and provides a 4% rebate on eligible American Airlines travel purchased with the card.

American Express has a specialized corporate meeting credit card. Another specialized American Express business card is the American Express Corporate Purchasing Card, which can be assigned to individual employees or departments. Reconciliation and accounting services are available to make these functions easier for the corporation.

Non-proprietary cards
In December 2000, American Express agreed to acquire the US$226million credit card portfolio of Bank of Hawaii, then a division of Pacific Century Financial Corp. In January 2006, American Express sold its Bank of Hawaii card portfolio to Bank of America (MBNA). Bank of America will issue Visa and American Express cards under the Bank of Hawaii name. Until 2004, Visa and Mastercard rules prohibited issuers of their cards from issuing American Express cards in the United States. This meant, as a practical matter, that U.S. banks could not issue American Express cards. These rules were struck down as a result of antitrust litigation brought by the U.S. Department of Justice, and are no longer in effect. In January 2004, American Express reached a deal to have its cards issued by a U.S. bank, MBNA America. Initially decried by Mastercard executives as nothing but an "experiment", these cards were released in October 2004. Some said that the relationship was going to be threatened by MBNA's merger with Bank of America, a major Visa issuer and original developer of Visa (and its predecessor, BankAmericard). However, an agreement was reached between American Express and Bank of America on December 21, 2005. Under the terms of the agreement, Bank of America will own the customer loans and American Express will process the transactions. Also, American Express will dismiss Bank of America from its antitrust litigation against Visa, Mastercard, and a number of U.S. banks. Finally, both Bank of America and American Express also said an existing card-issuing partnership between MBNA and American Express will continue after the Bank of America-MBNA merger. The first card from the partnership, the no-annual-fee Bank of America Rewards American Express card, was released on June 30, 2006.

Since then, Citibank, Wells Fargo, First National Bank of Omaha, USAA, Navy Federal, Synchrony Financial, and US Bancorp have started issuing American Express cards. Citi issues the Macy's and Bloomingdale's American Express cards along with Citi-branded cards. Wells Fargo issues American Express cards under their own brand and for Dillard's. US Bancorp issues American Express-branded cards for US Bank along with Elan Card Services, a subsidiary that issues credit cards on behalf of small to midsize banks. Some credit unions, including PenFed, also issue American Express cards. JPMorgan Chase is the largest bank and the only Big Four bank in the US that does not partner with American Express. Instead, JPMorgan made the decision in 2013, to partner with Visa on the ChaseNet closed-loop network that is similar in terms of functionality to the American Express network.

Product suite

Traveler's cheques
American Express is the largest provider of traveler's cheques in the world. In 2005, American Express released the American Express Travelers Cheque Card, a stored-value card that serves the same purposes as a traveler's cheque, but can be used in stores like a credit card. Amex discontinued the card in October 2007, due to "changing market conditions" and issued refund checks to cardholders for the remaining balances.

Financial advisors
On September 30, 2005, American Express spun-off its American Express Financial Advisors unit, Ameriprise Financial, to its shareholders. On September 30, 2005, RSM McGladrey acquired American Express Tax & Business Services (TBS).

International bank
In 2008, Standard Chartered Bank acquired American Express Bank Ltd, the international banking subsidiary of American Express for US$823million.

Travel
American Express established a Travel Division in 1915, that tied together all earlier efforts at making travel easier, and soon established its first travel agencies. In the 1930s, the Travel Division had grown widely. Albert K. Dawson was instrumental in expanding business operations overseas, even investing in tourist relations with the Soviet Union. During World War I, Dawson was a photographer and film correspondent with the German army.

In March 2014, American Express announced that it signed an agreement to create a joint venture for business travel and spun off its corporate travel business as American Express Global Business Travel.

Publishing
The American Express Publishing Corporation published the Travel + Leisure, Food & Wine, Executive Travel, Black Ink, and Departures magazines until October 1, 2013, when it sold those titles to Time Inc. It publishes American Express Skyguide and is based in New York City. , Time Inc. is restructuring the portfolio of publications. These assets are now part of IAC's Dotdash Meredith.

Individual banking
American Express FSB (federal savings bank) is a direct bank offering a standard savings account to individuals. The names used are Centurion Bank and American Express Bank; both are Utah-based and TRS (Travel Related Services). American Express Rewards Checking, an online checking account, is available to consumer card members who have held card accounts for three or more months. There are no account fees and customers earn a 1.00% APY alongside Membership Rewards points on debit transactions.

Business banking
In 2020, American Express acquired Kabbage. In June 2021, the company's first checking account for small businesses, Kabbage Checking, was launched.

Full-service business checking for small and mid-sized businesses under the American Express brand was launched in October 2021.

In January 2023, the American Express Business Blueprint brand was introduced as a collection of financial services for small businesses, including small business lines of credit and other offerings previously under the Kabbage name.

Advertising campaigns

"Don't Leave Home Without Them"
In 1975, David Ogilvy of Ogilvy & Mather developed the highly successful "Don't Leave Home Without Them" ad campaign for American Express Traveler's Cheques, featuring Oscar-award-winning actor Karl Malden. Malden served as the public face of American Express Travelers Cheques for 25 years. In the UK, the spokesman was the television personality Alan Whicker.

After Malden's departure, and as the card assumed importance over the traveler's cheques, American Express continued to use celebrities, such as Mel Blanc and ballerina Cynthia Gregory. A typical ad for the American Express Card began with a celebrity asking viewers: "Do you know me?" Although he/she gave hints to his/her identity, the star's name was never mentioned except as imprinted on an American Express Card, after which announcer Peter Thomas told viewers how to apply for it. Each ad concluded with the celebrity reminding viewers: "Don't Leave Home Without It." The "Don't Leave Home Without It" slogan was revived in 2005.

The Adventures of Seinfeld & Superman

American Express continues to use celebrities in their ads. Some notable examples include a late 1990s ad campaign with comedian Jerry Seinfeld, including the two 2004 webisodes in a series entitled "The Adventures of Seinfeld & Superman".

"My life. My card. / Are You a Cardmember?"
In late 2004, American Express launched the "My life. My card." brand campaign, and later the "Are You a Cardmember?" brand campaign in 2007, (both by Ogilvy & Mather), featuring famous American Express cardmembers talking about their lives. The ads have featured actors/actresses Kate Winslet, Robert De Niro, Ken Watanabe, and Tina Fey; Duke University basketball coach Mike Krzyzewski; fashion designers Collette Dinnigan and Diane von Fürstenberg; comedian and talk show hostess Ellen DeGeneres; golfer Tiger Woods; professional snowboarder Shaun White; tennis pros Venus Williams, Andy Roddick, and Andre Agassi; surfer Laird Hamilton Manchester United manager José Mourinho; film directors Martin Scorsese, Wes Anderson, and M. Night Shyamalan; singers Sheryl Crow, Alicia Keys and Beyoncé.

Animals 
In 2007, a two-minute black-and-white ad, entitled "Animals" and starring Ellen DeGeneres, won the Emmy Award for Outstanding Commercial.

C. F. Frost
Many American Express credit card ads feature a sample American Express Card with the name "C. F. Frost" on the front. This is not a fabricated name; Charles F. Frost was an advertising executive at Ogilvy & Mather.

Cause marketing
American Express was one of the earliest users of cause marketing, to great success. A 1983 promotion advertised that for each purchase made with an American Express Card, American Express would contribute one penny to the renovation of the Statue of Liberty. The campaign generated contributions of $1.7 million to the Statue of Liberty restoration project. What would soon capture the attention of marketing departments of major corporations was that the promotion generated approximately a 28% increase in American Express card usage by consumers.

In May 2007, American Express launched an initiative called the Members Project. Cardholders were invited to submit ideas for projects, and were told American Express was funding the winning project.

Cultural projects and sponsored events

American Express supports initiatives to enhance the architectural and cultural heritage, with the aim of raising awareness on the importance of historical and environmental conservation, through the restoration of historical monuments. American Express is a founder sponsor of the global program "World Monuments Watch", launched in 1995, by World Monuments Fund. During the first edition of Corporate Art Awards, in 2016, American Express received by pptArt the Corporate Art Award for its international restoration program.

In 2019, Australian media company Pedestrian Group acquired Openair Cinemas, which had formerly been known as American Express Openair Cinemas. The brand refers to outdoor showings of films in open spaces across Australia and New Zealand.

Workplace

Offices

In April 1986, American Express moved its headquarters to the 51-story Three World Financial Center in New York City. After the events of September 11, 2001, American Express had to leave its headquarters temporarily because it was located directly opposite the World Trade Center and was damaged during the fall of the towers. The company began gradually moving back into its rehabilitated building in 2002. The company maintains major offices in Sunrise, Florida, Salt Lake City, and Phoenix, Arizona, with its main data centers in North Carolina and Phoenix.

AMEX Bank of Canada was founded in 1853, in Toronto. It has around 1,700 employees as of December 2020 in its head office at Sheppard, east of Highway 404 in Toronto (relocated from Markham, Ontario, a northern suburb of Toronto where it resided from 1985 to 2015), as well as an office in Hamilton, Ontario. The company began operations as a bank on July 1, 1990, following an order-in-council made by the Brian Mulroney government on November 21, 1988. This decision was not without controversy as federal banking policy at the time would not ordinarily have permitted American Express to operate as a bank. It is a member of the Canadian Bankers Association (CBA) and a registered member of the Canada Deposit Insurance Corporation (CDIC), the federal agency insuring deposits at all of Canada's chartered banks.

American Express has several offices in the UK, including a European Service Center in the Carlton Hill area of Brighton, England. The building was completed in 2012. It replaced American Express's former building, Amex House, a large white tower block built in 1977 and surrounded by several other smaller offices around the city. The American Express European Service Center deals with card servicing, sales, fraud and merchant servicing. Official Europe, Middle East, and Africa HQ is located in the Belgravia district of Westminster, in central London, at Belgrave House on Buckingham Palace Road, SW1; other UK offices are based in Sussex at Burgess Hill and Manchester. In November 2009, Brighton and Hove City Council granted planning permission for American Express to redevelop the Amex House site. Japan, Asia-Pacific, and Australian Headquarters is co-located in Singapore, at 16 Collyer Quay, and in Sydney's King Street Wharf area. The headquarters of Latin America and Caribbean division is in Fort Lauderdale, Florida.

American Express also has a significant presence in India. Its two centers are located at Gurgaon, Haryana(Cyber City,) and Bangalore ,Karnataka(Bagmane capital).The Indian operations of American Express revolve around the back office customer services operations apart from the credit card business for the domestic Indian Economy, arguably the American Express campus in Gurgaon is the largest employee location by headcount for Amex and supports business continuity objectives of Amex including during Hurricane Sandy, the center works 24/7 and includes a co-located second building which was recently transferred to a third party service provider but does much work for Amex.

Job satisfaction
In 2008, American Express was named the 62nd best company to work for in the United States by Fortune, ranking it number one for bank card companies. In October 2008, Amex Canada Inc. was named one of Greater Toronto's Top Employers by Mediacorp Canada Inc., which was announced by the Toronto Star newspaper. In 2018, Fortune ranked it the 23rd best company to work for. In 2019, Fortune ranked it the 9th best company to work for.

Corporate governance
Officers of the company are listed on the company's website.

, American Express shares are mainly held by institutional investors (Berkshire Hathaway, Vanguard group, BlackRock, State Street Corporation and others).

In popular culture
The "Don't Leave Home Without It" campaign was parodied by the American game show Press Your Luck in 1984, with the show's mascot, the "whammy", showing the viewers an "American Xcess" card, using the introduction of "Hello, do you know me?" The name "W-H-A-M-M-Y" is then revealed to the audience before taking all of the player's earnings to that point.

The campaign was also referenced in the film Major League, where the long-moribund Cleveland Indians, during their rise to contention, shoot a commercial for the card. The ad begins with the team, dressed formally as in many of the actual ads, asking fans "Do you know us? We're a Major League Baseball team!" while donning Indians caps, and finishes with leadoff hitter Willie Mays Hayes (played by Wesley Snipes) sliding in at home to say the appropriately-altered tagline, "don't steal home without it!".

List of CEOs 
 Henry Wells (1850–1866)
William Fargo (1866–1881)
J. C. Fargo (1881–1914)
George C. Taylor (1914–1923)
Frederick P. Small (1923–1944)
Ralph Reed (1944–1960)
Howard L. Clark Sr. (1960–1977)
James D. Robinson III (1977–1993)
Harvey Golub (1993–2001)
Kenneth Chenault (2001–2018)
Stephen Squeri (2018–present)

See also
 
 1995 "Gold Card Dress" of Lizzy Gardner 
 Small Business Saturday, a registered trademark of American Express
 J.P. Morgan Reserve Card (Palladium Card) – a competitor to the Centurion Card
 MasterCard, Visa and Discover Card – major competitors
 Credit score in the United States
 Banking in the United States
 American Express Community Stadium in East Sussex, England

References

External links

 

American Express
1850 establishments in New York (state)
1970s initial public offerings
Financial services companies based in New York City
Berkshire Hathaway
Butterfield Overland Mail
Companies based in Manhattan
Companies in the Dow Jones Industrial Average
Companies listed on the New York Stock Exchange
Contactless smart cards
Credit card issuer associations
Credit cards
Financial services companies established in 1850
Foreign exchange companies
Multinational companies based in New York City
Payment systems
Publicly traded companies based in New York City
Travel management
Wells Fargo